Anthony Wilson (born 8 October 1947) is a Trinidadian vocalist, bass guitarist and songwriter, best known for his time with soul and funk band Hot Chocolate. He co-wrote the Hot Chocolate hits "Love Is Life", "Emma",  "Brother Louie" and "You Sexy Thing".

Career
Wilson was born in Trinidad, and was involved with music from the age of 16. He was a member of the group Soul Brothers, who released three singles. He was a founding member of Hot Chocolate in 1968, and left the band in 1976. Wilson is credited with persuading Hot Chocolate's lead singer Errol Brown to commit his songwriting ideas to paper. He shared lead vocal duties with Brown on Hot Chocolate's early hits.

References

1947 births
Warner Records artists
EMI Records artists
Hot Chocolate (band) members
Trinidad and Tobago songwriters
20th-century bass guitarists
Living people